The Spout of Garnock (or Garnock Spout) is a waterfall in Ayrshire, Scotland. At approximately 60–70 ft high, it is the county's highest waterfall. It is not the source of the River Garnock, as is sometimes said, but is located about a mile and a half from the river's birth.

References

See also
Waterfalls of Scotland

Garnock
Garnock